Chloritis talabensis is a species of air-breathing land snail, a terrestrial pulmonate gastropod mollusk in the family Camaenidae.

Distribution 
The type locality is Balante auf Celebes, Sulawesi, Indonesia.

The species was described after only one specimen (“ein schönes Stück”), holotype by monotypy stored in the Staatliche Naturhistorische Sammlungen Dresden, Museum für Tierkunde, Dresden, Germany, number 10198. The species has been never recorded again since its discovery.

Shell description 
The shell is of moderate size for the genus, brown, with hairs, spire somewhat elevated, umbilicated, the ends of the peristome connected with a thin callus. The width of the shell is 24 mm.

References
This article incorporates CC-BY-3.0 text from the reference.

Camaenidae
Gastropods described in 1896